Chand means Moon in Hindi.

Chand is also both a given name, middle name and a surname of North Indians and Nepalese. Notable people with the name include:

Given name
Chand Bardai, Indian poet
Chand Bibi, Indian ruler and warrior
Chand Burke, Indian actor in Hindi and Punjabi language films
Chand Kaur, ruler of the Sikh Empire
Chand Nawab (born 1963), Pakistani journalist
Chand Sadagar, rich river and sea merchant of Champaknagar in Eastern India
Chand Usmani (1933–1989), Indian actress

Surname
Amir Chand (1889–1970), Indian physician and teacher of medicine
Anand Chand (1913–1983), 44th Raja of Bilaspur
Bhuwan Chand (born 1949), Nepali actress
Bidhi Chand (1579-1638), Sikh religious preacher
Binayadhoj Chand, Nepalese politician
Dashrath Chand (1941-????), Nepalese politician and martyr
Manzoor Chand (born 1942), Pakistani social worker
Dhyan Chand (1905–1979), Indian field hockey player
Dutee Chand (born 1996), Indian sprinter
Ganesh Chand, Fijian academic and politician of Indian descent
Hari Chand (1953-2022), Indian long distance runner
Lokendra Bahadur Chand (born 1940), former PM of Nepal
Meira Chand (born 1942), Swiss Indian novelist established in London
Mukesh Chand (1923–1976), Indian playback singer
Nar Bahadur Chand, member of 2nd Nepalese Constituent Assembly belonging to Nepali Congress
Nek Chand (1924–2015), Indian artist
Nihâl Chand (1710–1782), Indian painter and poet
Parmod Chand (born 1955/1956), Fijian politician and a member of the Fijian Parliament
Prithvi Chand, Indian politician
Ramesh Chand (born 1974), Indian politician
Rohit Chand (born 1992), Nepalese Footballer
Sansar Chand (c. 1765–1824), Rajput ruler of the state of Kangra in what is now the Indian state of Himachal Pradesh
Sri Chand, founder of the ascetic sect of Udasin and son of Guru Nanak, first guru and founder of Sikhism
Tara Chand (archaeologist), Vice-Chancellor of Allahabad University, India
Tara Chand (Himachal Pradesh politician), member of the Himachal Pradesh Legislative Assembly
Tara Chand (Jammu-Kashmir politician) (born 1963), member of the Jammu and Kashmir Legislative Assembly
Tara Chand (Pakistani politician), former Provincial Minister of Balochistan
Tapan Kumar Chand (born 1959), Indian mining veteran, executive and author
Unmukt Chand (born 1993), Indian cricketer

See also
Chand (disambiguation)